The Pacific Rubiales Colombia Classic was a golf tournament that is co-sanctioned by the Challenge Tour and the Pacific Colombia Tour. It was played for the first and only time in 2012 at the Barranquilla Country Club in Barranquilla, Colombia.

Winners

References

External links
Coverage on the Challenge Tour's official site

Former Challenge Tour events
Golf tournaments in Colombia
2012 establishments in Colombia
2012 disestablishments in Colombia